Nathaniel, Nathan or Nat Rogers may refer to:

Nathaniel Rogers (minister) (1598–1655), English clergyman and early New England pastor
Nathaniel Peabody Rogers (1794–1846), American lawyer, abolitionist writer and newspaper editor
Nathaniel Rogers (physician) (1808–1884), English medical practitioner and donor of stained glass windows
Nat Rogers (1893–1981), African-American baseball player
Nathan Rogers (writer) (1638– after 1708), Welsh political radical and writer
Nathaniel Rogers (painter) (1787–1844), American painter
Nathaniel Rogers (MP) (died c. 1738), British merchant and politician
Nathan Rogers (born 1979), Canadian folk musician and songwriter

See also
Rogers (surname)
Nathaniel Rogers House, American historic home on Long Island in Suffolk County hamlet of Bridgehampton